Love v Commonwealth; Thoms v Commonwealth is a High Court of Australia case that held that Aboriginal Australians could not be classified as aliens under section 51(xix) of the Australian Constitution. The case was decided on 11 February 2020.

Background 

Daniel Love and Brendan Thoms were men who had failed their migration character tests as a result of serving jail sentences. Neither Love nor Thoms was an Australian citizen, but both identified as Aboriginal Australians. The government was trying to deport both men as aliens under the provisions of the Migration Act 1958, based on a 2014 amendment of the Act.

Love was a recognised member of the Kamilaroi people who was born in Papua New Guinea. He had been placed in immigration detention after he was sentenced to more than a year in jail for assault occasioning actual bodily harm. His permanent residency visa was revoked by Home Affairs Minister Peter Dutton, but this was later overturned and he was released from detention.

Thoms was a native title holder and a member of the Gunggari people who was born in New Zealand. He was also placed in immigration detention after serving part of an 18-month sentence for domestic violence. He remained in detention until the judgment was handed down.

The two men were aged in their 30s and 40s at the time of the court case. Both had lived in Australia since they were small children, and had close family in Australia. Both men were legal Australian permanent residents prior to their jail sentences.

The Attorney-General for the State of Victoria intervened and made submissions in support of both Love and Thoms. It argued that Aboriginality is equivalent to citizenship, on the basis the unique relationship between members of Aboriginal societies and the land and waters of Australia meant that Aboriginal Australians could not be considered "aliens" for the purposes of s 51(xix) of the Constitution.

Decision 
In the judgment, each judge issued a separate judgment. A majority of the Court (Bell, Nettle, Gordon & Edelman JJ) found that Aboriginal Australians (understood according to the tripartite test in Mabo v Queensland (No 2)) were not within the reach of the "aliens" power conferred by s 51(xix) of the Constitution.

The majority could not, however, determine whether Love was an Aboriginal Australian and remitted the matter to the Federal Court to deal with that question. As Thoms had already been recognised as an Aboriginal Australian through his native title claim, the Court determined that he was not an alien.

Consequences

The following day, Christian Porter, then Attorney-General of Australia, said the decision created "an entirely new category of people in terms of what the government can and can't do" a non-citizen non-alien, or "belonger". Porter said that the government would be looking to deport the small group of Aboriginal non-citizens who have committed serious offences in a different way. Peter Dutton described the decision as "a very bad thing" that would be "exploited by lawyers", and said he had sought legal advice from the Department of Home Affairs that would be "looking to restrict the damage".

Constitutional law professor Anne Twomey said that it was too early to tell what the ramifications would be, especially in light of the fact that each of the seven-person bench had given individual reasonings. The Law Council of Australia said that a number of "complex issues" had been raised, and would give rise to a great deal of debate and scrutiny.

Wamba Wamba lawyer Eddie Synot of the Indigenous Law Centre at the University of New South Wales said the judgment concerned a "very narrow application of the aliens power" and explicitly stated that it was not a recognition of Aboriginal sovereignty.

See also 
 Australian Aboriginal identity 
 Australian constitutional law

References

Further reading
 – analysis of ramifications

External links 
 – includes all documents
 – full hearing and final judgment

High Court of Australia cases
2020 in Australian law
Australian constitutional law
Australian migration law
Australian nationality law
Indigenous Australian case law
Rights in the Australian Constitution cases
2020 in case law